The 17th European Trampoline Championships took place in Eindhoven, Netherlands, in October, 2000.

Competition summary

Medal table

Results

References
 Results
 Report and additional results (in German)

European Trampoline Championships
2000
2000 in Dutch sport
International gymnastics competitions hosted by the Netherlands